Thelonious Monster is an American punk rock band from Los Angeles, California, led by singer-songwriter Bob Forrest and named after jazz musician Thelonious Monk. Active from 1984 to 1994, again from 2004 to 2011, and reforming a second time in 2019, the band has released five original studio albums. It has been described as having "traced emotional dips and bends with exceptional acuity and impact".

History
Members include Forrest on vocals; bass players Jon Huck, Rob Graves, Dallas Don Burnett and Martyn LeNoble; guitarists Chris Handsone, Bill Stobaugh, Dix Denney, Zander Schloss, Mike Martt, K.K. Barrett, Jon Sidel; and drummer Pete Weiss. They were a popular live attraction in the underground rock clubs of Hollywood in the 1980s but never achieved major commercial success.

Their 1986 debut album, Baby...You're Bummin' My Life out in a Supreme Fashion was described as "bluesy, jazzy, snaggle-toothed singer-songwriter pop blaring through a busted speaker."

1987 saw the release of Next Saturday Afternoon, long time Los Angeles Times music critic Robert Hilburn wrote that it would be "prized by those who crave penetrating and perceptive rock ‘n’ roll. In its best moments, the LP explores questions of identity and self-worth in stark, unflinching ways that recall the passion and purpose of some of rock’s classic collections."

In 1988, guitarist John Frusciante auditioned for Thelonious Monster. He was in the band for only three hours before being asked to join the Red Hot Chili Peppers.

1989 saw the release of Stormy Weather, called "still far from the smooth or dance-happy edges preferred by mainstream radio, the album is more accessible than its predecessor. There are some winning melodic touches amid the occasional all-out, slam-bam rock ‘n’ roll."

In 1992, the band released Beautiful Mess on Capitol Records. The Los Angeles Times described it as "another series of soul-searching tunes about relationships and self-doubts. What distinguishes Forrest’s music is the absence of self-pity. In the tradition of John Lennon, Forrest is capable of expressing irony or anger in a social context, but he recognizes the enemy is often within." The following tour brought the band around the world, including a notorious set at the 1993 Pink Pop Festival

After several years of sporadic activity and Forrest's tenure with The Bicycle Thief, Thelonious Monster reunited in 2004 at the Coachella Valley Music and Arts Festival in Indio, California and at the Sunset Junction Street Fair in Los Angeles, and released their first new album in 12 years. California Clam Chowder would feature guitarist Josh Klinghoffer, who was also a member of Forrest's short-lived band, The Bicycle Thief. Klinghoffer would eventually go on to replace John Frusciante in the Red Hot Chili Peppers.
 
In 2009 Thelonious Monster reunited for their first shows in five years. The band played a show at The Echo in Los Angeles as a warm-up for dates on Warped Tour, and a show at Pappy And Harriet's in Pioneertown, California.

Former members of Thelonious Monster are featured in the 2011 documentary Bob and the Monster, which details the life and career of Bob Forrest.

In 2019, Bob announced on his Instagram account that Thelonious Monster were in the studio working on a new album. He also posted a photo of Dix Denney and Josh Klinghoffer working in the studio.

Band members
Current
Bob Forrest – lead vocals (1984–1994, 2004–present)
Pete Weiss – drums, percussion (1984–1994, 2004–present)
Chris Handsone (a.k.a. "Chris Handsome") – guitar (1984–1989, 1992–1994, 2019–present)
Martyn LeNoble – bass (1990–1992, 2019–present)

Former
Dix Denney – guitar (1984–1994, 2004–2023) (died 2023)
Jon Sidel – guitar (1992–1994, 2004)
K. K. Barrett – guitar (1986)
Bill Stobaugh – guitar (1986) (died 1996)
Jon Huck – bass (1984–1988)
Rob Graves – bass (1988–1990) (died 1990)
Tony Malone – guitar (1989)
Zander Schloss – guitar (1992–1994, 2009–2015)
Dallas Don Burnet – bass (1992–1994, 2004–2015)
Mike Martt – guitar (1989–1991, 2009–2015)

Discography
Studio albums
Baby...You're Bummin' My Life out in a Supreme Fashion (1986)
Next Saturday Afternoon (1987)
Stormy Weather (1989)
Beautiful Mess (1992)
California Clam Chowder (2004)
Oh That Monster (2020)

Singles and EPs
The Boldness of Style (1987)
So What If I Did (1989)
Blood Is Thicker Than Water (1992)
Body and Soul? (1993)
Adios Lounge (1993)

References

External links
Official Band Website
Bob Forrest Official Website
[ allmusic]
Thelonious Monster on Trouserpress.com

Alternative rock groups from California
Musical groups from Los Angeles
Musical groups established in 1983
Musical groups disestablished in 1994
Musical groups reestablished in 2004
Punk rock groups from California